The Dungri Garasia are a clan of the Bhil ethnic community found in the states of Gujarat and Rajasthan in India. They have scheduled tribe status.

Origin

The word Dungri literally hills and Garasia means a clearer of forest in the Rajasthani dialect. According to their traditions, this community of Bhils migrated from Mewar about three hundred years ago to escape the Muslim forces attacking the Maharana Pratap. They are now found in the taluks of Meghraj, Bhiloda, Vijaynagar, and Khed Brahma taheshil, Gujarat, where the community still speaks vagdi.

Present circumstances

Gujarat
In Gujarat, the Adivasi dungri garasia are an endogamous community. They consists of two sub-divisions, the Bhagat and Sansari, who do not intermarry. These sub-divisions in turn consist of clans, which are exogamous. The major clan groupings are the Baranda,Balat, Kharadi, Pandor, Parmar, Moria, Damor, Gameti, Ninama,Taral, Bhagora, Suvera, Joshiyara, Asari, tabiyar, Khada, varsat, balevia and Katara.

References

Bhil clans
Scheduled Tribes of Rajasthan